Jacek Gawryszewski (born Jacek Winek; 20 March 1966 in Warsaw) is a Polish colonel of civil intelligence service and diplomat, serving as an ambassador to Chile since 2017.

Life 
Jacek Gawryszewski holds an M.A. in international relations from the University of Warsaw (1992). He has been also post-graduate student of journalism (1995).

During the 1980s he was active member of Solidarity movement. In 1986, he was sentenced for one year and seven months in prison for political reasons.

Between 1991 and 2002 he was officer of the Office for State Protection, and, from 2002 he served at the Internal Security Agency. From 2006 to 2007 he was the director of the Department of Counterterrorism. Between 2013 and 5 October 2017 he was deputy chief of the Agency.

He has been working at the embassies in Tunis, in charge of security of the embassy (1999–2000), Bogota, being responsible for consular services among others (2000–2005), Mexico City (2007–2008), representing Poland to Mexico as chargé d'affaires, and Berlin (2009) as a specialist for security issues of German-Polish relations.

On 28 August 2017 Jacek Gawryszewski was nominated ambassador to Chile. He presented his letter of credence to the President of Chile Michelle Bachelet on 25 October 2017.

Gawryszewski, beside Polish, speaks English, Spanish, and German languages. He is married.

Honours 

 Cross of Freedom and Solidarity, 2015
 Bronze Medal of Merit for National Defence, 2012
 Knight's Cross of the Order of Polonia Restituta, 2011
 Silver Medal for Long Service, 2011
 Bronze Cross of Merit, 2006

References 

1966 births
Ambassadors of Poland to Chile
Knights of the Order of Polonia Restituta
Living people
Diplomats from Warsaw
Polish intelligence officers
Recipients of Cross of Freedom and Solidarity
Recipients of the Bronze Cross of Merit (Poland)
Recipients of the Medal of Merit for National Defence
Solidarity (Polish trade union) activists
University of Warsaw alumni